Theodore Anastasios Kavalliotis (1718 – 11 August 1789) was a Greek Orthodox priest, teacher and a figure of the Greek Enlightenment. He is also known for having drafted an Aromanian–Greek–Albanian dictionary.

Early life
Theodoros Anastasiou Kavalliotis was born in Kavala or Moscopole, where he spent most of his life. He has been described variously as either Aromanian or Albanian or Greek. Regardless, Kavalliotis had a Greek identity. He studied in Moscopole and later pursued higher studies in mathematical and philosophical sciences at the Maroutseios college in Ioannina (in 1732-1734), directed by Eugenios Voulgaris.

Working period

He returned to Moscopole and was appointed teacher at the New Academy ( Nea Akadimia) in 1743. In 1750 he succeeded his former teacher Sevastos Leontiadis and became director of the New Academy for more than 20 years (1748–1769). His works, written in Greek, are Logic (1749, unpublished), Physics (1752, unpublished), Grammar of modern Greek (1760), Metaphysics (1767), Protopeiria (1770). They were used extensively and hand-made copies were found even as far as Iaşi, Romania. After the destruction of Moscopole at 1769, he probably went to Tokaj, Hungary, but returned at 1773.

In 1770, he published in Venice, at Antonio Bortoli's printing press, a school textbook, called Protopeiria. Protopeiria is a 104 pages textbook which in pages 15–59 included a trilingual lexicon of 1,170 Greek, Aromanian, and Albanian words. This work aimed at the Hellenization of the non-Greek-speaking Christian communities in the Balkans. The lexicon was re-published in 1774 by the Swedish professor Johann Thunmann, who taught at the University of Halle-Wittenberg. Thunmann added a Latin translation to the words in Greek, Aromanian, and Albanian.

Besides Eugenios Voulgaris, he was also influenced by the work of Vikentios Damodos,  Methodios Anthrakites, René Descartes, and medieval scholastics.

Kavalliotis couldn't manage to reestablish the destroyed New Academy. During his last months he witnessed another wave of destruction of his home place, in  June 1789 by local Muslim lords. Kavalliotis died at August 11, 1789, aged 71.

Sample from the first page of the Lexicon

Works
Εἰσαγωγὴ εἰς τὰ ὀκτω μέρη τοῦ λόγου. Ἐν Μοσχοπόλει 1760 καὶ Ἑνετίῃσι 1774.
Ἔπη πρὸς τὸν ἐξαρχικῶν ἐν Μοσχοπόλει ἐπιδημήσαντα Ἰωαννίκιον Χαλκηδόνος ἐν ἔτει 1750 Μαΐου 2.
Πρωτοπειρία. (Starting out)  Ἑνετίῃσιν, 1770. Παρὰ Ἀντωνίῳ τῷ Βόρτολι. Superiorum permissu. Ac privilegio.

References

Sources

Lexicographers
Greek Eastern Orthodox priests
Aromanian priests
Albanian language
Aromanians from the Ottoman Empire
Pro-Greek Aromanians
Greeks from the Ottoman Empire
1718 births
1789 deaths
People of the Modern Greek Enlightenment
People from Moscopole
Maroutsaia School alumni
18th-century Eastern Orthodox priests
People from Kavala
18th-century Albanian people
18th-century Albanian writers
18th-century Greek educators
18th-century Greek writers
18th-century lexicographers